This is a following list for the MTV Movie Award winners for Best Dressed. The award was first introduced in 2001.
It was last given out in 2002.

References

MTV Movie & TV Awards